Do Raaste (translation: Two Paths) is a 1969 Indian Hindi film directed by Raj Khosla. It stars Rajesh Khanna as the dutiful son and Mumtaz as his love interest. Balraj Sahni and Kamini Kaushal play the eldest son and his wife. Prem Chopra plays the wayward son with Bindu as his wife who creates disputes.

The story was based on the trials and tribulations of a lower-middle-class family.  It placed emphasis on respect for elders, the paramount status of the mother, the sanctity of the joint family and the supremacy of relations that are stronger than ties of blood.

Cast
 Rajesh Khanna as Satyen Gupta
 Mumtaz as Reena 
 Balraj Sahni as Navendra Prasad Gupta "Navendu"
 Prem Chopra as Birju Gupta
 Kamini Kaushal as Madhvi Gupta
 Veena as Mrs. Gupta (Satyen's mother)
 Asit Sen as Alopee Prasad
 Mehmood Jr. as Raju Gupta
 Bindu as Neela Alopee Prasad (Mrs. Birju Gupta)
 Jayant as Khan

Soundtrack

The music for all the songs were composed by Laxmikant Pyarelal and the lyrics were penned by Anand Bakshi.  Three more revival tracks were added to the 1969 soundtrack album reviving old songs with newer music. The tracks are as follows:

Box office
The film became a blockbuster at the box office. This film is counted among the 17 consecutive hit films Rajesh Khanna between 1969 and 1971, by adding the two-hero films Marayada and Andaz to the 15 consecutive solo hits he gave from 1969 to 1971.

In India, the film grossed . This made it the second highest-grossing film of 1969 at the Indian box office, below Aradhana.

Overseas in the United Kingdom, the film was released in 1970. Its UK box office record was broken a year later by Purab Aur Paschim, which released in the UK in 1970.

In total, the film grossed an estimated  in India and the United Kingdom.

Awards and nominations
18th Filmfare Awards:
Won

 Best Story – Chandrakant Kakodkar

Nominated

 Best Film – Raj Khosla
 Best Director – Raj Khosla
 Best Supporting Actress – Bindu
 Best Music Director – Laxmikant Pyarelal
 Best Lyricist – Anand Bakshi for "Bindiya Chamkegi"
 Best Female Playback Singer – Lata Mangeshkar for "Bindiya Chamkegi"

References

External links
 

1969 films
1960s Hindi-language films
Indian buddy films
Indian romance films
Films directed by Raj Khosla
Films scored by Laxmikant–Pyarelal
1960s buddy films
1960s romance films
Hindi-language romance films